Hançerkale (literally "dagger castle") is the popular name given to a Byzantine observation tower ruin in Mersin Province, Turkey.

Geography
At , the tower is situated next to a mosque, in Ovacık village of Silifke district. It is accessible by an all-seasons open road.

Building
Although the popular name of the ruin is castle, actually it was a -tall observation tower built in the 6th century. The walls had been built by polygonal masonry technique. There are reliefs of a Dioskuri helmet, a shield, a sword and Herculus' Club on the southern wall.

References 

Byzantine sites in Anatolia
Archaeological sites in Mersin Province, Turkey
Silifke District
Observation towers
Byzantine fortifications in Turkey
6th-century fortifications
Olba territorium